Eugen Fischer (5 July 1874 – 9 July 1967) was a German professor of medicine, anthropology, and eugenics, and a member of the Nazi Party. He served as director of the Kaiser Wilhelm Institute of Anthropology, Human Heredity, and Eugenics, and also served as rector of the Frederick William University of Berlin.

Fischer's ideas informed the Nuremberg Laws of 1935 which served to justify the Nazi Party's belief in German racial superiority to other "races", and especially the Jews. Adolf Hitler read Fischer's work while he was imprisoned in 1923 and he used Fischer's eugenic notions in support of a pure Aryan society in his manifesto, Mein Kampf (My Struggle).

Fischer was born in Karlsruhe, Grand Duchy of Baden, in 1874. He studied medicine, folkloristics, history, anatomy, and anthropology in Berlin, Freiburg and Munich. In 1918, he joined the Anatomical Institute in Freiburg, part of the University of Freiburg.

In 1927, Fischer became the director of the Kaiser Wilhelm Institute of Anthropology, Human Heredity, and Eugenics (KWI-A), a role for which he'd been recommended the prior year by Erwin Baur.

In 1933 Fischer signed the Vow of allegiance of the Professors of the German Universities and High-Schools to Adolf Hitler and the National Socialistic State.

In 1933, Adolf Hitler appointed him rector of the Frederick William University of Berlin, now Humboldt University. Fischer retired from the university in 1942.
Otmar Freiherr von Verschuer was a student of Fischer.

After the war, he completed his memoirs, it is believed that in them he lessened his role in the genocidal programme of Nazi Germany. He died in 1967.

Early work

In 1906, Fischer conducted field research in German South West Africa (now Namibia). He studied the Basters, offspring of German or Boer men and Black African (Khoekhoe) women in that area. His study concluded with a call to prevent the production of a "mixed race" by the prohibition of "mixed marriages" such as those which he had studied. It included human experimentation on the Herero and Namaqua people. He argued that while the existing "Mischling" descendants of the mixed marriages might be useful for Germany, he recommended that they should not continue to reproduce. His recommendations were followed and by 1912 interracial marriage was prohibited throughout the German colonies. As a precursor to his experiments on Jews in Nazi Germany, he collected bones and skulls for his studies, in part from medical experimentation on African prisoners of war in Namibia during the Herero and Namaqua Genocide.

His ideas which were related to the maintenance of the apparent purity of races, influenced future German Nazi legislation on race, including the Nuremberg laws.

In 1927, Fischer was a speaker at the World Population Conference which was held in Geneva, Switzerland.

Nazi Germany

In the years from 1937–1938 Fischer and his colleagues analysed 600 children in Nazi Germany who were descended from French-African soldiers who occupied western areas of Germany after the First World War and were known as the Rhineland Bastards;  the children were subsequently subjected to sterilization.
 
Fischer did not officially join the Nazi Party until 1940. However, he was influential with National Socialists early on. Adolf Hitler read his two-volume work, Principles of Human Heredity and Race Hygiene (first published in 1921 and co-written by Erwin Baur and Fritz Lenz) while incarcerated in 1923 and used its ideas in Mein Kampf. He also authored The Rehoboth Bastards and the Problem of Miscegenation among Humans (1913), a field study which provided context for later racial debates, influenced German colonial legislation and apparently provided "scientific" support for the blatantly racist and anti-Semitic Nuremberg laws.

Under the Nazi regime, Fischer developed the physiological specifications such as skull dimensions which were apparently used to determine racial origins and he also developed the so-called Fischer–Saller scale for hair colour. He and the members of his team experimented on Gypsies and African-Germans, drawing their blood and measuring their skulls in order to scientifically validate his theories. After directing the Kaiser Wilhelm Institute of Anthropology, Human Heredity, and Eugenics, he was succeeded by Otmar Freiherr von Verschuer, who tutored Josef Mengele when he was active at Auschwitz.

Efforts to return the Namibian skulls which were taken by Fischer were started with an investigation which was conducted by the University of Freiburg in 2011 and they were completed with the return of the skulls in March 2014.

In 1944, Fischer intervened in an attempt to get his friend Martin Heidegger, the Nazi philosopher, released from service in the Volkssturm militia. However, Heidegger had already been released from service when Fischer's letter arrived.

Works

1909 to 1949
Fischer, Eugen. 1899. "Beiträge zur Kenntniss der Nasenhöhle und des Thränennasenganges der Amphisbaeniden", Archiv für Mikroskopische Anatomie. 55:1, pp. 441–478.
Fischer, Eugen. 1901. "Zur Kenntniss der Fontanella metopica und ihrer Bildungen". Zeitschrift für Morphologie und Anthropologie.4:1. pp. 17–30.
Fischer, Eugen, Professor an der Universität Freiburg i. Br. 1906. "Die Variationen an Radius und Ulna des Menschen". Zeitschrift für Morphologie und Anthropologie. Vol. 9. No. 2.
Fischer, Eugen. 1908. Der Patriziat Heinrichs III und Heinrichs IV. Tübingen: J.C.B. Mohr (Paul Siebeck). Fischer's PhD thesis.
Maass, Alfred. Durch Zentral-Sumatra. Berlin: Behr. 1910. Additional contributing authors: J.P. Kleiweg de Zwaan and E. Fischer.
Fischer, Eugen. 1913.Die Rehobother Bastards und das Bastardierungsproblem beim Menschen: anthropologische und ethnographiesche Studien am Rehobother Bastardvolk in Deutsch-Südwest-Afrika, ausgeführt mit Unterstützung der Kgl. preuss, Akademie der Wissenschaften. Jena: G. Fischer.
Gaupp, Ernst Wilhelm Theodor. Eugen Fischer (ed.) 1917. August Weismann: sein Leben und sein Werk. Jena: Verlag von Gustav Fischer.
Schwalbe, G. and Eugen Fischer (eds.). Anthropologie. Leipzig: B.G. Teubner, 1923.
Fischer, E. and H.F.K. Günther. Deutsche Köpfe nordischer Rasse: 50 Abbildungen mit Geleitwarten. Munich: J.F. Lehmann. 1927.
Fischer, Eugen and Gerhard Kittel. Das antike Weltjudentum : Tatsachen, Texte, Bilder. Hamburg: Hanseatische Verlagsanstalt, 1943.

1950 to 1959
Sarkar, Sasanka Sekher; Eugen Fischer and Keith Arthur, The Aboriginal Races of India, Calcutta: Bookland. 1954.
Fischer, Eugen. Begegnungen mit Toten: aus den Erinnerungen eines Anatomen. Freiburg: H.F. Schulz. 1959.

See also 
Karl Binding
Josef Mengele
Nazi eugenics
Nazi human experimentation
Nazi racial theories
Otmar Freiherr von Verschuer
Racial policy of Nazi Germany
Racism in Germany
Scientific racism
Subsequent Nuremberg trials
Doctors' Trial
Anthropometry
Fischer-Saller scale
Shark Island Concentration Camp
Rhineland Bastards

Notes

References

Schmuhl, Hans-Walter. "The Kaiser Wilhelm Institute for Anthropology, Human heredity and Eugenics, 1927-1945", Boston Studies in the Philosophy of Science vol. 259, Wallstein Verlag, Göttingen, 2003

Friedlander, Henry. 1997. The origins of Nazi genocide: from euthanasia to the Final Solution. University of North Carolina Press.  .

External links
Book Review of The Rehoboth Bastards in Nature (1913)
2004 Newspaper Article regarding The Rehoboth Bastards
The Rehoboth Bastards (Photo Album)
Herero and Namaqua Genocide - Galerie Ezakwantu

 
 

Detailed overview of Eugen Fischer with references
 

1874 births
1967 deaths
Physicians from Karlsruhe
German eugenicists
Members of the Prussian Academy of Sciences
Physicians in the Nazi Party
People from the Grand Duchy of Baden
University of Freiburg alumni
Academic staff of the University of Freiburg
Ludwig Maximilian University of Munich alumni
Academic staff of the University of Würzburg
Academic staff of the Humboldt University of Berlin
Nazi Party members
Nazi eugenics
People associated with the Kaiser Wilhelm Institute of Anthropology, Human Heredity, and Eugenics
People of the Herero and Namaqua genocide
Max Planck Institute directors